Kolb Aircraft Company  is an American aircraft manufacturer that produces kitplanes for amateur construction.

History
Homer Kolb first flew his initial commercial design, the Kolb Flyer, in 1970. The aircraft was ahead of its time and so Kolb waited until the ultralight aircraft boom of 1980 to incorporate his company, The Kolb Aircraft Company. Initially located in Phoenixville, Pennsylvania the company marketed a wide range of kit aircraft and achieved considerable commercial success, delivering over 3000 aircraft.

In 1999 the company was sold to a group of investors, moved to London, Kentucky and renamed The New Kolb Aircraft Company. The new company introduced a powered parachute model for a short time, the Kolb Flyer Powered Parachute.

In 2003 New Kolb Aircraft introduced the Canadian-designed Ultravia Pelican Sport 600 into the US market in partnership with Ultravia Aero from Canada and Brazil's Flyer Indústria Aeronáutica. When Ultravia went out of business in 2006 Kolb purchased Ultravia's assets, including the Pelican design. The company then improved and developed the Pelican into the Kolb Flyer Super Sport.

In March 2012 the company was sold to Bryan Melborn and renamed Kolb Aircraft Company, LLC.

Aircraft

References

External links

Aircraft manufacturers of the United States
Companies based in London, Kentucky
Manufacturing companies established in 1980
1980 establishments in Kentucky